Walter Johnson III (November 13, 1942 – June 30, 1999) was an American football defensive tackle who was drafted in the second round of the 1965 NFL Draft by the Cleveland Browns. He was a 3-time Pro Bowler (1967, 1968, 1969), a pro wrestler, and played 13 seasons in the National Football League.

Johnson’s grandson Josh Johnson played football at Iowa Central Community College and later transferred to Hampton University where he finished his college football career, while earning a degree in Psychology.  https://hamptonpirates.com/sports/football/roster/josh-johnson/665

Johnson's grandson Isaiah Johnson played college basketball at Akron.

Johnson also did professional wrestling beginning his career in 1968. His most famous match happened on February 16, 1974 against linebacker Ron Pritchard. Johnson won by disqualification. Also worked in Detroit and New Japan Pro-Wrestling. He continued wrestling until 1984.

Championships and accomplishments
NWA Hollywood Wrestling
NWA Americas Heavyweight Championship (1 time)

References

1942 births
1999 deaths
Players of American football from Cincinnati
American football defensive tackles
Cal State Los Angeles Diablos football players
Cleveland Browns players
Cincinnati Bengals players
Eastern Conference Pro Bowl players
New Mexico State Aggies football players
NWA Americas Heavyweight Champions
20th-century professional wrestlers